The Enosinian Society is a debate and literary society founded in 1822 during the first semester of the Columbian College.  It is currently known as The George Washington University Debate & Literary Society.

Adapting its name from the Greek word meaning "to shake" or "to contend," the Enosinian Society was founded on March 6, 1822, by a group of 15 students as the debate and literary society of the new Columbian College.  After the Columbian College changed its name to The George Washington University, the Enosinian Society changed its name as well, first to the George Washington University Debate Team, and then to its current name, The George Washington University Debate & Literary Society, so as to be more easily recognizable at public events and intercollegiate debate tournaments.

The George Washington University Debate & Literary Society is the oldest student society at the University and its members remain dedicated to the society's founding purpose of "improving ourselves in knowledge, eloquence and every accomplishment by which we may be the better prepared for any station in life." Currently, the "Enosinian" name is used for the society's alumni group and newsletter and GWU's Enosinian Scholars program.

The George Washington University Debate & Literary Society is directed by GWU Director of Debate Paul S. Hayes.

General Information

The Enosinian Society was formed in 1822 during the first semester of the Columbian College. On March 6, 1822 students of the newly formed University gathering "for the purpose of establishing a debating society." A constitution was drafted  and the society adopted the name of the "Enosinian." The original society met at Enosinian Hall, located on the fourth floor of the Columbian College's main building at College Hill, D.C. The society's first formal event was the celebration of Independence Day on July 4, 1822. In the fall of 1822, the Enosinian Society established its own library within the College's main library.

The emblem of the society was adopted in 1824, and a banner was gifted to society by the ladies of Washington, which remained in the society's hall until the sale of the College Hill campus in the 1870s.

Marquis de Lafayette visited Columbian College on December 13, 1824 and was greeted by the members of the Enosinian Society, who tended to Lafayette throughout his visit to the college. In return, Lafayette and his son agreed to be inducted as the first honorary members of the Enosinian Society. A bust was placed in the original Enosinian Hall in his honor and a debate tradition known as the "Lafayette Debates" was established.

In 2013, the GWU Debate & Literary Society revived the Lafayette Debates tradition in partnership with the Embassy of France to the United States to create one of the most prestigious international civic debating competitions hosted in the United States.

In 1827, The Columbian College suspended operations due to financial issues, and consequently the society suspended its operations. With the reopening of the college in 1829, students gathered to reorganize the society; however, regular meetings and debates did not resume until 1833.

In 1838, the society established the Enosinian Bee, a weekly newspaper publishing the work of society members. The GWU Debate & Literary Society currently publishes an annual newsletter entitled, the Enosinian Bee.

The society has suspended operations several times throughout its history. Operations were disbanded during the American Civil War due to low enrollment in the College after many students left to fight in the conflict.

In addition to the GWU Debate & Literary Society carrying on the society's intellectual traditions, and the Enosinian Society being retained as the name of the GWU Debate & Literary Society alumni group and newsletter, the Enosinian name has been adopted by a number of student organizations that have emerged and died out since 2000 as well as the GWU Enosinian Scholars Program.

Notable Enosinians

Thomas D. Eliot (Class of 1825), former U.S Congressman from Massachusetts. 
Baron Stow (Class of 1825), writer, editor, and influential Baptist Reverend.
William D. Porter (Class of 1825), Commodore, U.S Navy. 
William Greenleaf Eliot (Class of 1829), Founder of Washington University in St. Louis. 
Richard Wallach (Class of 1829), first Republican Mayor of Washington, D.C.
Walker Brooke (Class of 1831), former Senator from Mississippi. 
Henry May (Class of 1832), former U.S Congressman from Maryland.
William Carey Crane (Class of 1836), former President of Baylor University.
Christopher Pearse Cranch, American writer and artist. 
Elliott Coues (Class of 1859), noted surgeon, historian, ornithologist and author.

Honorary Enosinians

Marquis de Lafayette, Revolutionary War Hero and Personal Friend of President George Washington.
George Washington Lafayette, Son of Marquis de Lafayette.
Daniel Webster, U.S Secretary of State and Senator from Massachusetts. 
John C. Calhoun, Vice President of the United States, U.S Secretary of State, U.S Secretary of War, and Senator from South Carolina.
Henry Clay, U.S Secretary of State, Speaker of the House, and Senator from Kentucky.
Washington Irving, Author of The Legend of Sleepy Hollow and Rip Van Winkle.
William Cullen Bryant, 19th Century American Poet, author of Thanatopsis.
Nathaniel Parker Willis, 19th Century American Author.

References

Organizations established in 1822
George Washington University
College literary societies in the United States
1822 establishments in the United States